Mount de Sales Academy may refer to:

 Mount de Sales Academy (Georgia), United States
 Mount de Sales Academy (Catonsville, Maryland), United States